Carletonville is an unincorporated community in Meigs County, in the U.S. state of Ohio.

History
The community derives its name from Isaac Carleton, who started a school there in the 1860s.

References

Unincorporated communities in Meigs County, Ohio
Unincorporated communities in Ohio